Carex continua is a tussock-forming perennial in the family Cyperaceae. It is native to south eastern parts of Asia.

See also
List of Carex species

References

continua
Plants described in 1894
Taxa named by Charles Baron Clarke
Flora of China
Flora of Taiwan
Flora of Bangladesh
Flora of Laos
Flora of Myanmar
Flora of Nepal
Flora of Thailand
Flora of Vietnam